The Lemieux Library and McGoldrick Learning Commons is a building on the Seattle University campus, in the U.S. state of Washington. Designed by Pfeiffer, the LEED Gold-certified building was completed in 2010.

References

External links 
 
 Lemieux Library at Seattle University
 Seattle University Lemieux Library at the American Library Association

Buildings and structures in Seattle
Seattle University campus